Agnus (Latin for lamb) can be used to refer to :

People with the surname
 Felix Agnus (1839-1925), American military officer and newspaper publisher

Religion
 Agnus Dei (Latin: "Lamb of God")
 referring to Jesus Christ as divine sacrificial lamb
 an early prayer of the breviary

Places and jurisdictions
 Agnus (Egypt), an Ancient city and former bishopric in Aegyptus Primus, now a Latin Catholic titular see
 Agnus (Attica), a deme of ancient Attica

Biology
 Agnus scythicus, Latin for Vegetable Lamb of Tartary, a mythologic lamb-plant
 Agnus (beetle), a stag beetle genus

Technology
 MOS Technology Agnus, an integrated circuit in the OCS chipset of the Commodore Amiga computer